Neurergus crocatus, the yellow-spotted newt, Azerbaijan newt, Azerbaijan mountain newt, mountain newt, or Lake Urmia newt, is a species of salamander in the family Salamandridae. It occurs in the mountains west of Lake Urmia, in northwestern Iran, northeastern Iraq, and southeastern Turkey.

Description
The head is flattened and longer than it is wide. The snout is rounded. The body is slender and almost round, without a dorsal ridge. The tail is rounded at the base and laterally compressed towards its tip. The tail has moderately developed dorsal and ventral fins. The limbs are well-developed; the digits are thick and flat. Colouration is dorsally dark brown to black with yellow, rounded but somewhat irregular blotches; these continue on the tail. The ventral surfaces are orange-red in males and yellowish in females. They can live for between 12-15 years in captivity, and usually reach sexual maturity in four years.

Habitat and conservation
This species is probably threatened by habitat loss, caused by for example new dams.

Notes

References

Further reading
 

crocatus
Amphibians of Iran
Amphibians of Iraq
Amphibians of Turkey
Amphibians described in 1862
Taxa named by Edward Drinker Cope
Taxonomy articles created by Polbot